is a railway station on the Setagaya Line by Tokyu Corporation located in Setagaya, Tokyo, Japan.

Station layout
There are two side platforms on two tracks.

History
The station opened on January 18, 1925.

References

Tokyu Setagaya Line
Stations of Tokyu Corporation
Railway stations in Tokyo